Działoszyn  is a town in Pajęczno County, Łódź Voivodeship, in south-central Poland, with 5,627 inhabitants as of December 2021.

History
Działoszyn was granted town rights in 1421.

During the German invasion of Poland at the beginning of World War II, Działoszyn was the site of heavy fights between the Poles and the Germans. The town was heavily bombed by the Germans, and most of its Jews fled to nearby Paincheno, where they were employed in forced labor. Eventually, the town's Jews were murdered by the occupiers in the Holocaust. The German occupiers, renamed the town to Dilltal. In 1945, the German occupation ended, and the town's historic name was restored.

Sports
The local football club is Warta Działoszyn. It competes in the lower leagues. It was the first club of retired Poland national football team player Robert Warzycha.

Gallery

References

External links
 Official site of Działoszyn
 Jewish Community of Działoszyn/Zaloshin

Cities and towns in Łódź Voivodeship
Pajęczno County
Kalisz Governorate
Jewish communities destroyed in the Holocaust